England competed at the 1958 British Empire and Commonwealth Games in Cardiff, Wales, from 18 to 26 July 1958.

England finished at the top of the medal table.

Medal table

The athletes that competed are listed below.

Athletes

Bowls

Boxing

Cycling

Diving

Fencing

+ Part of the Sabre team but withdrew from some later matches through injury

Rowing

Swimming

Weightlifting

Wrestling

References

1958
Nations at the 1958 British Empire and Commonwealth Games
British Empire and Commonwealth Games